Mark John Hunter MBE (born 1 July 1978) is a retired British rower.

Rowing career
Hunter was born in Forest Gate, London and he attended Havering Sixth Form College. While representing Havering in the London Youth Games, he took part in some of his early rowing competitions. In 2007 he partnered Zac Purchase in the Great Britain Lightweight Men's Double Scull. They won medals at each World Cup Regatta through the season. At the World Rowing Championships in Munich-Oberschleissheim they won a Bronze medal. The following year, their double dominated the lightweight event, winning all of their races, and finishing the season as Olympic champions.  After a year off in 2009, they took Gold at the 2010 World Championships at Lake Karapiro in New Zealand. 
He was part of the British squad that topped the medal table at the 2011 World Rowing Championships in Bled, where he won a gold medal as part of the lightweight double sculls with Zac Purchase.

In 2013, Hunter announced his retirement from competitive rowing.

Coaching
During his year off after the 2008 Olympics, he was an assistant coach of UCLA Women's rowing program.

Awards
He was appointed Member of the Order of the British Empire (MBE) in the 2009 New Year Honours, and was awarded an Honorary Doctor of Science from the University of East London (UEL) in November 2009.

In 2009, Hunter was inducted into the London Youth Games Hall of Fame, and he was also granted an MBE for his services to rowing.

Achievements

Olympics
 2012 London – Silver, Lightweight Double Scull
 2008 Beijing – Gold, Lightweight Double Scull (stroke)

World Championships
 2011 Bled – Gold, Lightweight Double Scull
 2010 Lake Karapiro – Gold, Lightweight Double Scull
 2007 Munich – Bronze, Lightweight Double Scull

World Cups
 2012 Belgrade- Gold, Lightweight Double Scull (stroke)
 2010 Munich – Gold, Lightweight Double Scull (stroke)
 2008 Poznań – Gold, Lightweight Double Scull (stroke)
 2008 Lucerne – Gold, Lightweight Double Scull (stroke)
 2008 Munich – Gold, Lightweight Double Scull (stroke)
 2007 Lucerne – Silver, Lightweight Double Scull
 2007 Amsterdam – Silver, Lightweight Double Scull
 2007 Ottensheim – Bronze, Lightweight Double Scull
 2005 Munich – 6th, Lightweight Double Scull
 2005 Eton –  4th, Lightweight Double Scull

Nations Cup
 1999 – 8th, Heavyweight Double Scull
 1998 – 9th, Heavyweight Double Scull
 1997 – 10th, Heavyweight Quadruple Scull

GB Rowing Team Senior Trials
 2011 – 4th, Lightweight Single Scull

2008–2009 Coached for UCLA Women's Rowing Team

Footnotes

References
 
 

English male rowers
British male rowers
Living people
Olympic rowers of Great Britain
Rowers at the 2004 Summer Olympics
Rowers at the 2008 Summer Olympics
Rowers at the 2012 Summer Olympics
English Olympic medallists
Olympic gold medallists for Great Britain
Olympic silver medallists for Great Britain
1978 births
Rowers from Greater London
Members of the Order of the British Empire
Olympic medalists in rowing
Medalists at the 2012 Summer Olympics
Medalists at the 2008 Summer Olympics
Members of Leander Club
Stewards of Henley Royal Regatta
World Rowing Championships medalists for Great Britain
People educated at Havering Sixth Form College